The 1968 United States Senate election in California was held on November 5, 1968.

Incumbent Republican Thomas Kuchel was narrowly defeated in the June 4 primary by Superintendent of Public Instruction Max Rafferty. Rafferty would in turn go on to lose to Democratic former State Controller Alan Cranston by a close margin.

Republican primary

Candidates 
Phil Cammack
W.C. Jones
Thomas Kuchel, incumbent U.S. Senator and Assistant Minority Leader
Max Rafferty, California Superintendent of Public Instruction since 1963
James A. Ware, perennial candidate for office from Los Angeles

Results

Democratic primary

Candidates 
Anthony Beilenson, State Senator from Beverly Hills
William M. Bennett, member of the California Public Utilities Commission
Walter Buchanan, perennial candidate
Charles Crail
Alan Cranston, former California State Controller

Results

General election

Candidates
Alan Cranston (Democratic)
Paul Jacobs (Peace & Freedom)
Max Rafferty (Republican)

Results

References

1968
California
United States Senate